The Center for Research and Security Studies (CRSS) is a Pakistani,  Islamabad-based independent non-profit think tank founded by civil society activists to conduct research and advocacy on democratic governance, regional peace and security, human rights, and counter-radicalization. CRSS was founded in 2007 by journalist and writer Imtiaz Gul.

The CRSS specializes in communication to impart information to people in conflict- and disaster-hit areas.

The head of the think tank is Imtiaz Gul, a strategic analyst, writer, and journalist.

References

External links
Official website

Think tanks based in Pakistan
2007 establishments in Pakistan
Organizations established in 2007
Foreign policy and strategy think tanks based in Pakistan
Political and economic think tanks based in Pakistan